The 2004–05 season was Klubi i Futbollit Tirana's 66th competitive season, 66th consecutive season in the Kategoria Superiore and 84th year in existence as a football club.

Competitions

Albanian Supercup

Kategoria Superiore

League table

Results summary

Results by round

Matches

Albanian Cup

Second round

Third round

Quarter-finals

Semi-finals

Final

UEFA Champions League

First qualifying round

Second qualifying round

References

 

KF Tirana seasons
Tirana
Albanian football championship-winning seasons